The Left is a democratic socialist political party in the Czech Republic. The party was founded in 2020 as the result of the merger of the Party of Democratic Socialism and The Real Left initiative.

Election results

Chamber of Deputies

References

External links

Official website  

2020 establishments in the Czech Republic
Democratic socialist parties in Europe
Party of the European Left member parties
Political parties established in 2020
Socialist parties in the Czech Republic